To Be Still is the second studio album by indie folk musician Alela Diane, released February 17, 2009 on Rough Trade Records.

Track listing

References

2009 albums
Alela Diane albums